Ping-pong, or table tennis, is a sport where players hit a lightweight ball back and forth across a table.

Ping-Pong, Ping Pong, or Pingpong may also refer to:

Diplomatic and legislative affairs
 Parliamentary ping-pong, a term for when legislation is passed back and forth between two house of parliament
 Ping-pong diplomacy, a thawing in relationships between China and the United States in the 1970s

Mathematics, science and technology
 Ping-pong lemma, any of several mathematical statements for proving that some elements in a group acting on a set freely generate a free subgroup of that group
 Ping-pong scheme, a programming algorithm
 Ping-Pong virus, a computer virus

Media and arts

Films
 Ping Pong (1986 film), a British film
 Ping Pong (2002 film), a Japanese manga-adaptation film
 Ping Pong (2012 film), a British documentary, directed by Hugh Hartford 
 Ping Pong Playa, a 2007 film directed by Jessica Yu

Recording
 Ping-pong recording, a production technique using multiple tape decks

Vocalists, groups and labels
 PingPong (band), an Israeli band
 Ping Pong (singer), a Surinamese singer

Albums and EPs
 Ping Pong (EP), a 1994 EP by Stereolab
 Ping Pong (Momus album) (1997)
 The Ping Pong EP, a 2000 album by SNFU
 Ping Pong (Jacuzzi Boys album), a 2016 album by Jacuzzi Boys
 Ping Pong over the Abyss, a 1982 album by The 77s

Songs
 "Ping Pong" (Armin van Buuren song)
 "Ping Pong" (Hyuna and Dawn song)
 "Do You Know? (The Ping Pong Song)", a 2007 song by Enrique Iglesias

Other arts, entertainment, and media
 Ping Pong (manga), a Japanese manga series by Taiyō Matsumoto
 Ping Pong (TV series), a 2021 Chinese TV series
 Ping Pong, a character from the animated TV series Camp Lazlo
 Ping-Pong Club, a Japanese manga by Minoru Furuya
 Ping pong show, a sex tourism show prevalent in Thailand
 Konami's Ping Pong, a 1985 video game from Konami

See also
 Bing-bong (disambiguation)
 Ping (disambiguation)
 Pong (disambiguation)